In Chicago, crime has been tracked by the Chicago Police Department's Bureau of Records since the beginning of the 20th century. The city's overall crime rate, especially the violent crime rate, is higher than the US average. Chicago was responsible for nearly half of 2016's increase in homicides in the US, though the nation's crime rates remained near historic lows as of 2016. Some attribute the city's strong gang culture to the city's unusually high crime rate compared to neighboring cities, and some do not.

Overview
Chicago saw a major rise in violent crime starting in the late 1960s. Murders in the city peaked in 1974, with 970 murders when the city's population was over three million, resulting in a murder rate of around 29 per 100,000, and again in 1992, with 943 murders when the city had fewer than three million people, resulting in a murder rate of 34 murders per 100,000 citizens.

After 1992, the murder count steadily decreased to 415 murders by the mid-2000s, a reduction of over 50 percent. In 2018, there were 561 murders.

Violent crime

Chicago experienced major rises in violent crime in the 1920s, in the late 1960s, and in the 2020s. a decline in overall crime in the 2000s, and then a rise in murders in 2016. Murder, rape, and robbery are common violent crimes in the city, and the occurrences of such incidents are documented by the Chicago Police Department and indexed in annual crime reports.

After adopting crime-fighting techniques in 2004 that were recommended by the Los Angeles Police Department and the New York City Police Department, Chicago recorded 448 homicides, the lowest total since 1965. This murder rate of 15.65 per 100,000 population was still above the U.S. average, an average which takes in many small towns and suburbs.

By 2010, Chicago's homicide rate had surpassed that of Los Angeles (16.02 per 100,000), and was more than twice that of New York City (7.0 per 100,000). 
By the end of 2015, Chicago's homicide rate rose to 18.6 per 100,000. By 2016, Chicago had recorded more homicides and shooting victims than New York City and Los Angeles combined. 
By the end of 2020, Chicago's homicide rate rose to 28 per 100,000.

Chicago's biggest criminal justice challenges have changed little over the last 50 years, and statistically reside with homicide, armed robbery, gang violence, and aggravated battery.

Murder and shootings 

Former Chicago Police Superintendent Garry McCarthy said a pervasive "no-snitch code" on the street remains the biggest reason more murders aren't being solved in Chicago, adding, "We're not doing well because we're not getting cooperation [...] They don't feel protected when they come forward. They feel that police will throw them under a bus, and they still have to live in the neighborhood." By 2016, Chicago's murder clearance rate had dropped to only 21%, and its detective force had dwindled from 1,151 in 2009 to 863 as of July 2016. Warmer months have significantly higher murder rates, and over 70% of murders take place between 7 pm and 5 am.

In 2011, 83% of murders involved a firearm, and 6.4% were the result of a stabbing. 10% of murders in 2011 were the result of an armed robbery and at least 60% were gang or gang narcotics altercations. Over 40% of victims and 60% of offenders were between the ages of 17 and 25. 90.1% of victims were male. 75.3% of victims and 70.5% of offenders were African American, 18.9% were Hispanic (20.3% of offenders), and whites were 5.6% of victims (3.5% of offenders).

Murder rates in Chicago vary greatly depending on the neighborhood in question. Many of the predominantly African American neighborhoods on the South Side are impoverished, lack educational resources and noted for high levels of street gang activity. The neighborhoods of Englewood on the South Side, and Austin on the West side, for example, have homicide rates that are ten times higher than other parts of the city. Violence in these neighborhoods has had a detrimental impact on the academic performance of children in schools, as well as a higher financial burden for school districts in need of counselors, social workers, and psychiatrists to help children cope with the violence. In 2014, Chicago Public Schools adopted the "Safe Passage Route" program to place unarmed volunteers, police officers and firefighters along designated walking routes to provide security for children en route to school. From 2010 to 2014, 114 school children were murdered in Chicago.

Chicago Police Superintendent Garry McCarthy was terminated by Rahm Emanuel following the fall out from the shooting of Laquan McDonald.

A gunshot wound to center mass can quickly prove fatal without immediate medical attention due to blood loss and internal injuries. In September 2015, University of Chicago Medicine and Sinai Health Systems announced a joint $40 million venture to convert Holy Cross Hospital into a Level 1 trauma center on the South side, making some of Chicago's most violent neighborhoods less than five miles from high-quality care. Non-fatal gunshot victims in Chicago had an overall rate of occurrence of 46.5 per 100,000 from 2006–2012, with a demographic breakdown of 1.62 per 100,000 for whites; 28.72 for Hispanics, and 112.83 for blacks. It is estimated that the medical expenses associated with gun violence costs the city of Chicago $2.5 billion a year.

Chicago has been criticized for comparatively light sentencing guidelines for those found illegally in possession of a firearm. Most people convicted of illegal gun possession receive the minimum sentence, one year, a Chicago Sun-Times analysis found, and serve less than half of the sentence because of time for good behavior and pre-trial confinement. The minimum sentence for felons found in possession of a firearm is two years. Those charged with simple gun possession had an average of four prior arrests. Felons charged with prior gun related crimes will be faced with stricter sentencing as of a new bill proposed in 2017. Those charged with gun possession by a felon had an average of ten prior arrests.

In September 2015, an area and neighborhood of Chicago, West Garfield Park, was named "America's mass shooting capital", citing 18 occasions in 2015 in which at least four people were shot in a single incident. In 2016, the number of murders soared to 769. August 2016 marked the most violent month Chicago had recorded in over two decades with 92 murders, included the murder of Nykea Aldridge, cousin of NBA star Dwyane Wade. Chicago's 2016 murder and shooting surge has attracted national media attention from CNN, The New York Times, USA Today, Time magazine and PBS. Filmmaker Spike Lee's 2015 release, Chi-Raq, highlights Chicago's gun violence using a narrative inspired by the Greek comedy Lysistrata.

In 2017, the number of homicides fell to 653, dropping to 561 in 2018 and 492 in 2019. Chicago's deadliest day since reliable digital records began in 1991 occurred on May 31, 2020, with 18 murders committed. This day was part of a three-day weekend that saw 85 shootings in the city. Reports indicate that the victims were of various ages and occupations, but mostly black. The violence was framed by the George Floyd protests, but researchers said it was unheard of and unable to be contextualized. The city's second-deadliest day saw 13 murders, and occurred in 1991 shortly after digital records were introduced; there is no deadlier day recorded in the past 60 years, but records prior to 1991 may be unreliable.

Street gangs

Chicago has an estimated population of over 100,000 active gang members from nearly 60 factions. Gang warfare and retaliation is common in Chicago. Gangs were responsible for 61% of the homicides in Chicago in 2011.

Former Chicago Police Superintendent Garry McCarthy blames Chicago's gang culture for its high rates of homicide and other violent crime, stating "It's very frustrating to know that it's like 7% of the population causes 80% of the violent crime...The gangs here are traditional gangs that are generational, if you will. The grandfather was a gang member, the father's a gang member, and the kid right now is going to be a gang member."

Mayor Rahm Emanuel disbanded the Chicago Police Department's anti-gang unit in 2012 in order to focus on beat patrols, which he said would have a more long-term solution to violence than anti-gang units.

As many as 70 active and inactive Chicago street gangs with 753 factions have been identified. Some of the gangs that contribute most of the crime on the streets of Chicago:
Gangster Disciples
Vice Lords
Black P. Stones
Latin Kings
Black Disciples
Maniac Latin Disciples
Spanish Cobras
Almighty Saints
Spanish Gangster Disciples
Four Corner Hustlers

Detailed analysis of the homicides timeline by month show that homicides (of all races) went up right after Martin Luther King was killed in 1968 (still for reasons unknown). However, Hispanic-on-Hispanic homicides, did not notably start until the summer of 1971, due to the Latin Kings gang election meetings. However, this claim can't be immediately proven, as homicides by race are not made public for those time periods.

Political corruption

Chicago has a long history of public corruption that regularly draws the attention of federal law enforcement and federal prosecutors. Chicago's political landscape has been firmly under the control of the Democratic Party for over 85 years and has been widely described as a political machine. In the 1980s, the FBI's Operation Greylord uncovered massive and systemic corruption in Chicago's judicial system. Greylord was the longest and most successful undercover operation in the history of the FBI, and resulted in 92 federal indictments, including 17 judges, 48 lawyers, eight policemen, ten deputy sheriffs, eight court officials, and one state legislator. Nearly all were convicted on a variety of charges including bribery, kickbacks, fraud, vote buying, racketeering, and drug trafficking.

The late 1980s and 1990s saw further efforts by the FBI to prosecute Chicago's public crime syndicates. Operation Incubator obtained about a dozen convictions or guilty pleas, including those from five members of the City Council and an aide to former Mayor Harold Washington. Later Operation Gambat brought a wide range of charges against a Chicago judge, a state senator, an alderman, and two others relating to corruption in the Cook County Circuit Court, the Illinois Senate, and the Chicago City Council. Four were convicted and a fifth died during trial. The most extensive operation by the FBI of the 1990s, Operation Silver Shovel, sought to uncover corruption within Chicago labor unions, organized crime, and other city government officials. Operation Silver Shovel resulted in the conviction of six Chicago aldermen and a dozen other local officials on a wide range of corruption related charges.

From 2012 to 2019, 33 Chicago aldermen were convicted on corruption charges, roughly one third of those elected in the time period. A report from the Office of the Legislative Inspector General noted that over half of Chicago's elected alderman took illegal campaign contributions in 2013. In 2015, mayor appointed Barbara Byrd-Bennett, the CEO of Chicago Public Schools, was convicted in a $23 million kickback scheme and was sentenced to seven and-a-half years in prison. In addition to the Bennett conviction, a joint investigative report issued by the Office of the Inspector General and federal authorities documented widespread corruption within Chicago Public Schools in 2015. The audit noted the criminal shakedown of a CPS vendor, a records forgery scheme by a principal, numerous instances of employees abusing CPS's tax-exempt status to purchase personal items at big-box retailers, illegally using taxpayer-funded resources to campaign for political causes and stealing from taxpayer-funded accounts intended for purchasing student materials.

A 2015 report released by the University of Illinois at Chicago's political science department declared Chicago the "corruption capital of America", citing that the Chicago-based Federal Judicial District for Northern Illinois reported 45 public corruption convictions for 2013 and a total of 1,642 convictions for the 38 years since 1976 when the U.S. Department of Justice began compiling the statistics. UIC Professor and former Chicago Alderman Dick Simpson noted in the report that "To end corruption, society needs to do more than convict the guys that get caught. A comprehensive anti-corruption strategy must be forged and carried out over at least a decade. A new political culture in which public corruption is no longer tolerated must be created".

Examples of other high-profile Chicago political figures convicted on corruption related charges include Rod Blagojevich, Jesse Jackson Jr., Isaac Carothers, Arenda Troutman, Edward Vrdolyak, Otto Kerner, Jr., Constance Howard, Fred Roti and Dan Rostenkowski.

In October 2015, the FBI announced that Michael Anderson would take over for a retiring Robert Holley as Special Agent in Charge of the Chicago Bureau. Anderson, a corruption veteran who wrote the FBI Public Corruption Field Guide, called Chicago "target rich" for cases in an interview with the Chicago Tribune. Anderson commands a team of 850 agents in Chicago along with analysts and support staff.

Most corruption cases in Chicago are prosecuted by the US Attorney's office, as legal jurisdiction makes most offenses punishable as a federal crime. The current US Attorney for the Northern district of Illinois is Zachary T. Fardon. In a press conference in January 2016, in the wake of the conviction of former Chicago City Hall official, John Bills, for taking $2 million in bribes, Fardon commented "Public corruption [in Chicago] is a disease and where public officials violate the public trust, we have to hold them accountable. And I do believe that by doing so, it sends a deterrent message."

Policing
In the years between 1875 and 1920 Chicago had a depletion of conviction rates. This was a result of the exoneration and acquittals of criminals. This was due to Cook County government and the jurors who listened to these cases. During this period, the Progressive Era, the first juvenile system was created by Chicago officials and, to make the court system more organized and specific, specialized courts, like those for domestic disputes, were created. Not only did the court and corrections systems change, there was also a change in policing. Divisions and squads became specialized on particular types of crime. The courts began to incorporate specialists, like scientists and psychologists, to make the trial and evidence more reliable and trustworthy. 

Chicago was among the first U.S. cities to create an integrated emergency-response center to coordinate the response to natural disasters, gang violence, and terrorist attacks. Built in 1995, the center is integrated with more than 2000 cameras, communications with all levels of city government, and a direct link to the National Counterterrorism Center. Police credited surveillance cameras with contributing to decreased crime in 2004.

In 2003, the Chicago Police Department began installing POD's (Police Observation Devices) in high-crime areas. The cameras are able to rotate 360 degrees and zoom to a fine level of detail. The devices are also bulletproof, operable in any weather condition, record continuously and switch into night-vision mode after dark. POD's are used to monitor street crime and direct police deployment. Data from the cameras is wirelessly transmitted to the Chicago Crime Prevention and Information Center (CPIC) which can individually control any camera. Over 20,000 cameras currently operate in Chicago. In addition to PODs, colloquially referred to as "blue-light cameras", the city has added general surveillance cameras to CTA stations, buses, Chicago Housing Authority buildings, public buildings and schools. This has prompted harsh criticism from privacy advocates and the ACLU who called the program "A pervasive and poorly regulated threat to our privacy".

The Chicago Police Department has also been criticized for its liberal use of the controversial "stop-and-frisk" policy. For decades, the policy gave officers much more autonomy to conduct stops and pat-downs if there exists a reasonable suspicion that a suspect might be armed and dangerous. The ACLU has claimed that the policy unfairly targets African Americans, who accounted for nearly 75% of those stopped in 2014, even though they account for a third of the city's population. The Chicago Police Department confiscated almost 7,000 firearms in 2014, about 583 per month. The stop-and-frisk policy was largely abandoned by CPD in early 2016.

Because the Chicago Police Department tallies data differently than police in other cities, the FBI often does not accept its crime statistics . Chicago police officers record all criminal sexual assaults, as opposed to only rape . They count aggravated battery together with the standard category of aggravated assault . As a result, Chicago is often omitted from studies such as Morgan Quitno's annual "Safest/Most Dangerous City" survey, which relies on FBI-collected data.

The Chicago Police Department's CLEAR (Citizen Law Enforcement Analysis and Reporting) system is a web application enabling the public to search the Chicago Police Department's database of reported crime. Individuals are able to see maps, graphs, and tables of reported crime. The database contains 90 days of information, which can be accessed in blocks of up to 14 days. Data is refreshed daily. However, the most recent information is always six days old.

The police use "guardian-like" intervention, a method relying on information from an individual's criminal history in order to predict the likelihood of becoming a victim or perpetrator of violence, to "build public trust and legitimacy."

CPD tallied 22 police-involved shootings in 2015, eight of which resulted in fatalities. Fatality cases involving an African American perpetrator often gave rise to a media sensation, both in Chicago and elsewhere. In December 2015, the US Department of Justice opened a civil rights investigation of the Chicago Police Department in the aftermath of the Laquan McDonald case. The "pattern and practice" probe evaluated the use of force, deadly force, accountability and tracking procedures of the department. A 190-page report issued in April 2016 deemed the Chicago Police Department a racist organization. Chairman of the Chicago Fraternal Order of Police, Dean Angelo called the report "totally biased" and "utterly ridiculous".

2016's surge in murders and shootings, coupled with a decline in gun seizures, led former Police Superintendent John Escalante to express concerns in March 2016 that officers might be hesitant to engage in proactive policing due to fear of retribution. Officers anonymously reported to the Chicago Sun-Times that they have been afraid to make investigatory stops because the Justice Department and American Civil Liberties Union of Illinois have been scrutinizing police practices. Data of the supposed pullback was reflected with an 80 percent decrease in the number of street stops that officers made since the beginning of 2016. Dean Angelo has claimed that part of the problem is politicians and groups like the ACLU who don't know much about policing, and yet are "dictating what police officers do".

Professors Paul Cassell and Richard Fowles at the University of Utah later analyzed the 2016 Chicago homicide "spike" and concluded that the most likely cause was a consent decree entered into by the American Civil Liberties Union (ACLU) with the Chicago Police Department restricting stop and frisks. Cassell and Fowles concluded that 239 additional victims were killed and 1129 additional shootings occurred in 2016 because of the reduction in stop and frisks.  This study, however, failed to identify such spikes in the large number of other cities subject to similar consent decrees, leading to questions about whether they had really identified a causal relationship.

Crime reporting accuracy 

In 2014 and 2015, Chicago Magazine and The Economist conducted investigations into the CompStat data reporting of crime statistics for the city and reported irregularities. In addition, an audit conducted by Chicago's Office of the Inspector General found significant problems in the accuracy of CPD's crime data.

According to Chicago Magazine, superiors often pressure officers to under-report crime. An unnamed police source quoted in the magazine says there are "a million tiny ways to do it", such as misclassifying and downgrading offenses, counting multiple incidents as single events, and discouraging residents from reporting crime. The police department has responded that their statistics are generally accurate and that the discrepancies can be explained by differences in the Uniform Crime Reporting used by the FBI and CompStat.

Gun laws and dealers 
The city of Chicago has one of the highest murder rates among large cities. Despite generally strict gun laws compared to neighboring areas, there are still many illegal guns in Chicago.  It is estimated that 80% of homicides in Chicago are committed with firearms. Chicago recorded 780 murders in 2020. This figure represents an increase of more than 55% over 2019. On the Fourth of July weekend 2021, at least 100 people, mostly African-American, were shot, 18 of them fatally. Murders for 2021, are trending higher than 2020.

Chicago has a ban on guns designated as "assault weapons" and laser sights. Additionally, under Illinois law, to own a firearm one must possess a firearms owners’ identification (FOID) card, undergo a background check, and wait 72 hours before taking possession of a purchased firearm. Lost or stolen guns must also be reported to law enforcement within 72 hours. There are currently no gun stores in the Chicago city limits, although easy access to guns is likely occurring via neighboring Indiana and the many other areas with different gun laws.

About 7000 guns are recovered by Chicago police each year at crime scenes. An estimated 45% of these guns are bought by straw buyers in states with lax gun laws, namely Indiana. In April 2021, the City of Chicago filed a lawsuit against Westforth Sports of Gary Indiana, alleging that it consistently ranks as one of the highest suppliers of guns used in crimes. The city claims that during the period from 2009 to 2016, 850 recovered guns were originally purchased from Westforth Sports.

See also 
 Gangs in Chicago
 Chuck's Gun Shop & Range
 Kids Off The Block
 Race and crime in the United States

References

Further reading

Hagedorn, John and Brigid Rauch. "Housing, Gangs, and Homicide What We Can Learn from Chicago." Urban Affairs Review. March 2007 vol. 42 no. 4 435–456. doi: 10.1177/1078087406294435.

External links
 Chicago Police Department
 CPD crime map generator
 ChicagoCrime.org
 Chicago homicide map generator
 Online Crime Map of Chicago- SpotCrime.com
 Table of Chicago gang raids by Chicago police and federal police
 Crimes in Chicago and Illinois

 
Chicago